Saiva or Shaiva may refer to:

Saiva is a genus of Asian lanternbugs, family Fulgoridae.
Saiva kurukkals redirects to Vellalar, which were the nobility, aristocracy of the ancient Tamil order.
Shaiva Siddhanta or Saiva-Siddhanta,  provides the normative rites, cosmology and theological categories of tantric Saivism.
Shaivism or Saivism is one of the four most widely followed sects of Hinduism.
Saiva Neri [The saiva way] , part of the Tirumurai, a twelve-volume collection of Tamil Śaiva devotional poetry.
Urumpirai Saiva Tamil Vidyalayam is a provincial school in Urumpirai, Sri Lanka.
The Saiva Agamas are a subset of the Agamas.
The Saiva revivalism promoted by Arumugam Pillai.
The Saiva Siddhanta Church is a spiritual institution and identifies itself with the Śaivite Hindu religion.
The South India Saiva Siddhanta Works Publishing Society Ltd. (also known as Kazhagam) is a Tamil book publishing company.